The Mexico City ePrix is an annual race of the single-seater, electrically powered Formula E championship, held in Mexico City, Mexico. It was first raced in the 2015–16 season.

Circuit
The ePrix is held at the Autódromo Hermanos Rodríguez and is currently the only permanent racing facility on the Formula E calendar, albeit in a very different form to the version used in Formula One. The layout is just over two kilometers in length, and is based on a modified version of the one-mile short oval used in the NASCAR Mexico Series. It utilises the full Peraltada final corner, whereas the exit of the Foro Sol section is next to the entrance. It was slightly altered for the 2017 edition, with the Turn 1 chicane being reprofiled to make for better racing. Track layout modification was done by Agustin Delicado Zomeño.

In 2020, a new section was added after turn 2, including a sweeping right-hander. The back straight had its chicane eliminated, giving drivers a clear run into Foro Sol stadium section.          

In 2023, the chicane at the back straight was added again.

Layout evolution

Results

Repeat winners (drivers)

Notes

References

 
Mexico City
Auto races in Mexico
Sports competitions in Mexico City
Recurring sporting events established in 2016
2016 establishments in Mexico